Ghabaghib ( Ġabāġib; also spelled Ghabagheb) is a town in southern Syria, administratively part of the Daraa Governorate, located north of Daraa. Nearby localities include Muthabin to the southeast, al-Sanamayn to the south, Deir al-Bukht, Deir al-Adas to the east, Khan Dannun to the north and al-Qin to the northwest.

According to the Syria Central Bureau of Statistics (CBS), Ghabaghib had a population of 11,802 in the 2004 census. The town is also the administrative center of the Ghabaghib nahiyah which consists of thirteen villages with a combined population of 45,793.

History
On 16 January 1192 news reached Jerusalem that Alam al-Din Sulayman, an emir ("commander") of Ayyubid general Saladin, had died in Ghabaghib on his way to Aleppo. Later, in the early 13th-century, the town was visited by Syrian geographer Yaqut al-Hamawi who noted that it was "a village in the nearer districts of Hauran, 6 leagues from Damascus."

Ottoman era
In 1596 Ghabagib appeared in the Ottoman tax registers being part of the nahiya (subdistrict) of Bani Kilab in the Qada of Hauran. It had an entirely Muslim population consisting of 6 households and 5 bachelors. The villagers paid a fixed tax rate of 25% on various agricultural products, including  wheat, barley, summer crops, goats and/or beehives; a total of 2,000  akçe.

In 1838, Ghubaghib was noted as a Muslim village, situated "the Nukra, north of Al-Shaykh Maskin".

In the mid-19th-century, Ghabaghib was a small village with structures built of black basalt stone. The town, situated along the Hajj caravan route between Damascus and Mecca, served as an intermediate rest stop between Khan Dannun and al-Sanamayn. A tower was built in the town on the orders of Ottoman Sultan, Selim I. Ghabaghib later became a station on the Damascus–Daraa line of the Hejaz Railway. During the Syria–Lebanon Campaign in World War II, Ghabaghib served as the headquarters for the Free French Forces in southern Syria. The town was nicknamed "Rhubarb" by British soldiers who found the name too difficult to pronounce.

In 1906 the traveler William Ewing noted that "At Ghabaghib ... great cisterns and scattered ruins tell of an important place in times past."

References

Bibliography

External links
 Map of town, Google Maps
 Sanameine-map; 19L

Populated places in Al-Sanamayn District
Towns in Syria